Estradiol butyrylacetate/testosterone ketolaurate/reserpine (EBA/TKL/R), sold under the brand name Klimanosid R-Depot, is an injectable combination medication of estradiol butyrylacetate (EBA), an estrogen, testosterone ketolaurate (TKL; testosterone caprinoylacetate), an androgen/anabolic steroid, and reserpine, an antipsychotic, which was previously used in menopausal hormone therapy for women, particularly in those with pronounced neurovegetative symptoms. It contains 2 mg EBA, 50 mg TKL, and 0.4 mg reserpine in oil solution in each 1 mL ampoule and is administered by intramuscular injection at regular intervals. The medication was marketed in 1957.

EBA/TKL reportedly has a duration of about 21 days.

Oral tablet products with the same brand names of Klimanosid and Klimanosid R, containing methylestradiol and methyltestosterone, with and without reserpine, were marketed around the same time as Klimanosid-R Depot, and should not be confused with the injectable formulation.

See also 
 List of combined sex-hormonal preparations

References 

Abandoned drugs
Antipsychotics
Combined estrogen–androgen formulations